Mario Babić (born 3 July 1992) is a Croatian footballer who currently plays for second tier Kustošija.

Club career
On 24 February 2021, he joined Sambenedettese in Italian Serie C. On 14 July 2021, his contract with Sambenedettese was terminated by mutual consent.

References

External links
NZS profile 

1992 births
Living people
Footballers from Zagreb
Association football midfielders
Croatian footballers
Croatia youth international footballers
GNK Dinamo Zagreb players
NK Sesvete players
NK Istra 1961 players
NK Rudar Velenje players
A.F.C. Tubize players
NK Široki Brijeg players
NK Tabor Sežana players
A.S. Sambenedettese players
NK Kustošija players
First Football League (Croatia) players
Croatian Football League players
Slovenian PrvaLiga players
Challenger Pro League players
Premier League of Bosnia and Herzegovina players
Serie C players
Croatian expatriate footballers
Expatriate footballers in Slovenia
Expatriate footballers in Belgium
Expatriate footballers in Bosnia and Herzegovina
Expatriate footballers in Italy
Croatian expatriate sportspeople in Slovenia
Croatian expatriate sportspeople in Belgium
Croatian expatriate sportspeople in Bosnia and Herzegovina
Croatian expatriate sportspeople in Italy